Soap Opera Magazine was a weekly periodical devoted to interviews and recaps of American soap opera and was run for many years by American Media until the company, which had lost money for years, decided to cease publication of the magazine, focusing instead on their tabloid endeavors.

The final issue was published on February 16, 1999. At that time, all customers who had existing Soap Opera Magazine subscriptions began receiving Soap Opera Digest instead.

See also
 Soap Opera Digest
 Soap Opera Update
 Soap Opera Weekly
 Soaps In Depth

References

1991 establishments in the United States
1999 disestablishments in the United States
Defunct magazines published in the United States
Magazines about soap operas
Magazines established in 1991
Magazines disestablished in 1999
Television magazines published in the United States
Weekly magazines published in the United States